Simone Hines is an American contemporary R&B singer who was most active in the late 1990s. Her only charting single was her debut single "Yeah! Yeah! Yeah!", which peaked at #38 on the Billboard R&B chart in 1997.

Discography

Albums
 Simone Hines (1997)

Singles

References

External links
 
 
 
 

1975 births
American contemporary R&B singers
Date of birth missing (living people)
Epic Records artists
Living people
Musicians from Trenton, New Jersey
Singers from New Jersey
21st-century American singers